The 2000 Minnesota Golden Gophers football team represented the University of Minnesota in the 2000 NCAA Division I-A football season. In their fourth year under head coach Glen Mason, the Golden Gophers compiled a 6–6 record and outscored their opponents by a combined total of 375 to 318. The team made an appearance in the MicronPC.com Bowl, but was not ranked in either the final USA Today/AFCA Coaches poll or Associated Press poll.

Schedule

Personnel

Rankings

Season summary

at Ohio State

    
    
    
    
    
    
    
    
    

Minnesota snapped a 16-game losing streak to Ohio State and beat Glen Mason's alma mater in Columbus for the first time since 1949.

References

Minnesota
Minnesota Golden Gophers football seasons
Minnesota Golden Gophers football